Baflo (Gronings: Bavvelt) is a village in the municipality of Het Hogeland, Netherlands.

Famous people born in Baflo include humanist Rodolphus Agricola (1443/1444–1485) and jurist Gezina van der Molen  (1892–1972).

Until 1990, Baflo was a separate municipality. Baflo has a railway station - Baflo railway station.

Church of St. Laurentius 
Baflo church was originally dedicated to St. Laurentius. It is the large one-aisled church with free standing tower. The church was first mentioned in 1211. 
The tower of church is separated from the main building.

Gallery

References

External links
 

Artificial dwelling hills
Former municipalities of Groningen (province)
Populated places in Groningen (province)
Het Hogeland